The Kaikadi are a community found in the Indian state of Maharashtra. Traditionally they were nomadic, mainly wandering in the Vidarbha region of the state, but most have now settled down. They face significant oppression and were once called a Criminal Tribe, and so were placed on the list of Denotified Tribes (DNTs) after independence. They speak Kaikadi, a Dravidian language closely related to Tamil with significant Indo-Aryan admixture. Colonial scholars had a significant disdain for the community, with Robert Vane Russell calling them "disreputable" and with "bad morals." Russell recorded their occupation as basket-making. Colonial scholars claimed the community arrived from Telangana and they were related to the Yerukala.

The community has several endogamous septs: 9 recorded in Vidarbha. They also have a set of exogamous clans:  Gaikwad, Patke, Mule and Mane. Marriage within the clan is forbidden, as is marriage outside a sept. Kaikadi men can't marry maternal aunt's daughter, although maternal uncle's children are allowed like in most of South India.

Their social status is considered very low. Their touch supposedly "polluted" communities above the Kunbi in the caste hierarchy and they are barred from entering village temples although they can live inside. They are classified as a Denotified Tribe for purposes of Reservation, although in much of Vidharbha they are classified as [[Scheduled Castes and they are central  cast come under obc class .(other backward class )he Kaikadis mainly worship Nagas, mainly on Nag Panchami, but also pay reverence to Khandoba. They practice the puberty function like other Tamil communities.

References 

Ethnic groups in India
Culture of Maharashtra